Crime of Passion is a 1957 American film noir crime drama directed by Gerd Oswald and written by Jo Eisinger. The drama features Barbara Stanwyck, Sterling Hayden and Raymond Burr.

Plot
Kathy Ferguson is a San Francisco newspaper advice columnist.  One day, Lieutenant Bill Doyle, a Los Angeles police detective, and his partner, Captain Charlie Alidos, track a fugitive wanted for murder to San Francisco. He meets Kathy and they fall in love. She manages to gain the female fugitive's trust and locate her. Kathy's resulting front page story leads to an offer of a big job in New York City, but she abandons her career, marries Bill and moves to Los Angeles.

Her new role as a 1950s suburban wife and homemaker quickly makes her unhappy. She wants her husband to move up in the world, to become "somebody". Bill has different values. He works in order to afford a comfortable lifestyle, no more. Kathy schemes to push her husband up the career ladder without his knowledge. She arranges to get into a car accident with Alice Pope, in order to become acquainted with her husband, Police Inspector Tony Pope, head of Bill's division. Tony realizes what she has done, and why, but plays along.

Her continuing ploys inevitably bring her into conflict with Sara, the captain's equally ambitious wife, and Charlie begins to find fault with Bill at every opportunity. Vicious rumors circulate about Kathy's relationship with Tony. When Bill sees a poison pen letter that Kathy has received, he rushes to work and punches his boss, Charlie, in front of two police witnesses. During the investigation, Tony shifts enough of the blame to Charlie, suggesting he reached for his gun when the visibly angry Bill burst into the room, that he can hush up the whole incident. Charlie is then transferred to another division, and Bill is given his former position as an acting homicide captain.

When Alice breaks down under the years of mental strain of being a policeman's wife and is hospitalized, Tony decides to retire. When Tony comes to tell Kathy about Alice's breakdown and his plans to retire, Kathy tries to persuade him to recommend Bill for the vacancy his departure will create. During their talk, he seems to consider the idea favorably, then grabs and kisses her. She recoils at first, then embraces him. Afterward, however, he avoids her. When Kathy finally forces Tony to meet her, he says that he regrets their one-night stand and dismisses any suggestion he would recommend Bill for promotion as "pillow talk".  He makes it clear that he believes that Bill is not qualified, and that he is going to recommend Charlie as his successor. This elevation of a man she hates over Bill's ambition infuriates Kathy.

When Kathy accompanies Bill to the police station, she steals a gun used in a robbery and murder that her husband is investigating.  Kathy then confronts Pope in his home and appeals to him once again, noting that this time she's asking not just for Bill but for herself.  With Pope planning to recommend Charlie Alidos, it means that she cheated on Bill only to gain nothing and she's consumed by guilt over that. She pleads that he at least not recommend Alidos. If Pope recommends no one, Kathy argues, her husband still has a chance to get the job and she will be left with some justification for her infidelity. Pope coldly refuses, so she shoots him dead.

The entire police department works on Pope's murder investigation. When the murder weapon is discovered to have been a gun that the police had had in their custody and somehow lost, Bill figures out the killer has to have been his own wife since she was present at the time the gun went missing. When Bill confronts Kathy and she confesses, she tells him, "Now I'll know just how much of a cop you really are." Bill responds, "The same cop, Kathy. The same cop you met in Frisco. Same cop I was 10 years ago, pounding a beat. The same cop." He then drives her to police headquarters, where they walk in together and Bill reports in to secure a room to conduct questioning in the murder of Tony Pope.

Cast
 Barbara Stanwyck as Kathy Ferguson Doyle
 Sterling Hayden as Police Lieutenant Bill Doyle
 Raymond Burr as Police Inspector Anthony Pope
 Fay Wray as Alice Pope
 Virginia Grey as Sara Alidos
 Royal Dano as Police Captain Charlie Alidos
 Robert Griffin as Police Sergeant Jame
 Dennis Cross as Police Sergeant Jules
 Jay Adler as Mr. Nalence
 Stuart Whitman as Laboratory Technician
 Malcolm Atterbury as Police Officer Spitz
 Robert Quarry as Sam
 Gail Bonney as Mrs. London
 Joe Conley as Delivery Boy

Reception

Critical response
In a contemporary review for The New York Times, Howard Thompson called the film a "most curiously misguided dramatic missile" and criticized Stanwyck's performance: "[N]ever has she switched gears so abruptly during one performance as in this odd number ... As for Miss Stanwyck's transition from the nice, sassy gal in the press room to a maniacal stalker, we don't believe it. Come off it, Miss Stanwyck."

Recently, critic Dan Callahan gave the film a positive review, writing, "Hayden installs Stanwyck into a hellish suburbia where the women only talk about their TV sets; after a particularly trying montage of idle housewife chatter, Stanwyck rages against the mediocrity all around her. When she rails against her kitchen duties, she's a '30s star railing potently against '50s conformity. Though her character turns violent, the reasons behind her anger are powerfully expressed and the film puts you on her side. This overlooked, subversive movie has a strong feminist message and an even stronger Stanwyck performance."

Critic Glenn Erickson liked the film's noir screenplay and wrote, "Crime of Passion is a fascinating film that goes head-on with the classic conception of the femme fatale character. Screenwriter Jo Eisinger wrote the delirious 1946 Gilda, noir's most romantically perverse epic, but here she dissects the murderous female from a 50s perspective. It's hard-edged, direct in its theme and both dated and progressive at the same time. Barbara Stanwyck and Sterling Hayden make an exceptional screen couple."

See also
 List of American films of 1957

References

External links
 
 
 
 
 Crime of Passion informational site and film review at DVD Verdict
 

1957 films
1957 crime drama films
American black-and-white films
1950s English-language films
Film noir
Films set in Los Angeles
United Artists films
Films directed by Gerd Oswald
American crime drama films
Films scored by Paul Dunlap
1950s American films